Pequot Capital Management was a multibillion-dollar hedge fund sponsor that closed in 2010. The firm's investment funds invested in a range of markets through a  variety of strategies. The firm invested in public equities as well as private equity, venture capital, distressed securities, and various other fixed income securities. The firm closed in 2010 following allegations of insider trading.

History
Pequot was founded in 1998 by Arthur J. Samberg. Based in Westport, Connecticut, United States, the firm had additional offices in San Francisco; New York City; Los Angeles; Greenbrae, California; Menlo Park, California; Wellesley, Massachusetts; and London, United Kingdom.

In 2001 Pequot was reported to be the largest hedge fund globally with $15 billion in assets.

The firm's venture capital business, Pequot Ventures, spun off on June 30, 2008, into a separate company named FirstMark Capital. The company is based in New York City. FirstMark Capital received control of Pequot Ventures' existing venture capital portfolio assets.

Closure
In May 2009, the firm announced it was closing and, in an agreement with the Securities and Exchange Commission on May 27, 2010, paid a $28 million settlement (consisting of $18 million in returned profit and $10 million in penalties). Samberg was barred from working as an investment adviser for alleged violations of insider trading involving Microsoft Corporation stock occurring in 2001 and a prospective new hire of the hedgefund, David Zilkha, from Microsoft. On May 28, 2009, with an insider trading investigation ongoing, Samberg wrote, "With the situation increasingly untenable for the firm and for me, I have concluded that Pequot can no longer stay in business." SEC awarded $1 million to Glen Kaiser and Karen Kaiser for providing information leading to the settlement. One of the investigators of the case, Gary J. Aguirre, won a whistleblower case after being fired when he recommended that the investigation proceed further.

See also
FirstMark Capital

References

Further reading 
 Hedge Fund Retrenches by Giving Back Almost $2 Billion.  New York Times.
 World's Biggest Hedge Fund Group Plans, Once More, to Split.  New York Times.
 Many Hedge Funds Stumble on Wrong Side of Market Surge.  New York Times.
 THE MARKETS: Market Place; Hedge Fund Falls Victim To Tech Bear.  New York Times.
 Former First Boston Chief Is Named Chairman of Hedge Fund Company.  New York Times.
 S.E.C. Is Reported to Be Examining a Big Hedge Fund.  New York Times.
 Court Says S.E.C. Lacks Authority on Hedge Funds.  New York Times.
 Inquiry Clouds Future for a Hedge Fund Survivor.  New York Times.
 Panel Is Told S.E.C. Stopped a Hedge Fund Inquiry.  New York Times.
 Pequot Says S.E.C. Won't Take Action.  New York Times.

External links
 Pequot Capital Management (company website)
 FirstMark Capital (company website)

Financial services companies established in 1998
Defunct hedge funds
Hedge fund firms in Connecticut
Venture capital firms of the United States
Companies based in Westport, Connecticut